M.S. Muthu (born 20 July 1981) is a pharmaceutical engineer, scientist, inventor and one of the nineteen institute professors at the Department of Pharmaceutical Engineering and Technology, Indian Institute of Technology (BHU). He is a researcher in the field of nanomedicine, targeted drug delivery and theranostics nanomedicine for therapy and imaging. Dr. Muthu has completed his Ph.D. research work under the supervision of Prof. Sanjay Singh from Department of Pharmaceutical Engineering & Technology, IIT (BHU), Varanasi, India. He has done his post-doctoral research in Cancer Nanotechnology under the supervision of Prof. Feng Si-Shen from the National University of Singapore in 2010 & 2014 (2yrs). Dr. Muthu is an Associate Professor of Pharmaceutics in the  Department of Pharmaceutical Engineering & Technology, IIT(BHU).

He is a widely recognized and cited researcher in drug delivery especially in the fields of nanotechnology and theranostics. His research work is mainly focused on targeted and/or theranostic drug delivery of anti-cancer drugs, antipsychotics, antithrombotics and antimicrobials. He is the editor in chief for international peer reviewed journal ''Research & Reviews: Journal of Pharmacology and Toxicological Studies''. Additionally, he is the editorial board member of the "Diagnostics and Therapeutics" Journal published by Luminescience press is based in Hong Kong with offices in Wuhan and Xi’an, China. He is among the top 2% scientist globally, list compiled by the Stanford University. His profile has been listed at the 7th Rank in IIT BHU as per Adscientific index.

He has received more than 12 awards form government and non-government organization. He is the recipient of the BIRAC-DBT-Gandhian Young Technological Innovation (GYTI) Award in 2017, from the president of India for advancing nanomedicine research.  He has received a BOYSCAST fellowship from the Department of Science and Technology (DST), India and received CREST Award from the Department of Biotechnology (DBT), India.  He has received IMS-Research Publication Award for three years. Dr. Muthu has also received the Vice-Chancellor's Medical Research Award, BHU and International Faculty Award (VIFA-2016), India. His research work has secured Rs. 2.19 Crores fund from various government funding agencies that includes SERB, DST, DBT, ICMR India, BIRAC and DBT-IC. He has been elected as a Member of the National Academy of Sciences, India (NASI) in 2019. Additionally, he is a fellow of Royal Society of Chemistry (FRSC). His student has received the 2nd Prize for presentation in the Institute Day, IIT (BHU) in 2017. Recently, he has developed targeted nanomedicine for breast cancer therapy with reduced systemic toxicity, which has successfully demonstrated its efficacy in preclinical studies.

References 

1981 births
Living people
Indian scientists
Nanomedicine
Theranostics
Indian Institute of Technology (BHU) Varanasi alumni
National University of Singapore alumni